The House on 56, Allée de la Robertsau is an Art Nouveau building in the Neustadt district of Strasbourg, France. It is classified as a Monument historique by the French Ministry of Culture since 1975.

The house was built from 1902 until 1903 by the architects Franz Lütke (1860–1929) and Heinrich Backes (1866–1931) for the master baker Georges Cromer. It is considered as one of the most representative buildings of the Strasbourg brand of Art Nouveau architecture, influenced both by German and by French stylistic tendencies.

Lütke and Backes were professional partners from 1898 until 1907. A very prolific duo, they built a number of other Art Nouveau houses in Strasbourg, of which several are classified as Monuments historiques as well (such as 46, Avenue des Vosges; 22, Rue du Général de Castelnau; 4, Rue Erckmann-Chatrian; and 24, Rue Twinger).

Gallery

References

See also 
Villa Schutzenberger, in the same street

56
Monuments historiques of Strasbourg
Houses completed in 1903
Art Nouveau houses
20th-century architecture